Mervana Jugić-Salkić and Jelena Kostanić were the defending champions, neither chose to compete in 2005.

Katarina Srebotnik and Shinobu Asagoe won the title.

Draw

Seeds

  Shinobu Asagoe /  Katarina Srebotnik (winners)
  Jill Craybas /  Corina Morariu (first round)
 N/A (team withdrew)
  Janette Husárová /  Lina Krasnoroutskaia (semifinals)
  Abigail Spears /  Meilen Tu (quarterfinals)

Results

References

WTA Auckland Open
Tennis tournaments in New Zealand
Sport in Auckland
2005 WTA Tour
Auck